Spanish question may refer to:

 Spanish question, a discussion at the 1822 Congress of Verona
 Spanish question (United Nations), concerning the relationship between Francoist Spain and the UN after World War II

See also 
 Inverted question and exclamation marks, used to mark the start of questions and exclamations in Spanish orthography

National questions